Charles Swartz may refer to:

 Charles C. Swartz, Connecticut State Comptroller and mayor of Norwalk, Connecticut
 Charles S. Swartz (1939–2007), American filmmaker, researcher and academic